Abu-Mansuri Shahnameh or The Shahnameh of Abu-Mansur was a prose epic and history of Persian Empire before Muslim conquests. It was the main source of Shahnameh of Ferdowsi. The Shahnameh of Abu-Mansur is now lost, but its preface which consists of 15 pages, has survived and is one of the oldest examples of Persian prose and is considered one of the most valuable heritages of Persian literature. The Shahnameh of Abu-Mansur was composed at the order of Abu Mansur Muhammad in 346 AH (April 957 AD). It was composed by four mowbeds: Old Mākh from Herat, Yazdāndād son of Shāpur from Sistan, Shāhooy-e Khorshid son of Bahrām from Nishapur, Shādān son of Barzin from Tus. Before Ferdowsi, Abu-Mansur Daqiqi tried to versify the Shahnameh of Abu-Mansur, but he died after writing almost 1000 verses. Ferdowsi has included these 1000 verses in his Shahnameh.

References 

Shahnameh
10th-century books
Lost books